Get Down is a studio album by the American singer Joe Simon, released in 1975 on Spring Records.

Chart performance
The album peaked at No. 10 on the R&B albums chart. It also reached No. 129 on the Billboard 200. The album features the singles "Get Down, Get Down (Get on the Floor)", which peaked at No. 1 on the Hot Soul Singles chart and No. 8 on the Billboard Hot 100, and "Music in My Bones", which charted at No. 7 on the Hot Soul Singles chart and No. 92 on the Billboard Hot 100.

Track listing

Charts

Singles

References

External links
 

1975 albums
Joe Simon (musician) albums
Spring Records albums